Charles Derek Chinnery (27 April 1925 – 22 March 2015) was the controller of BBC Radio 1 from 1978 to 1985.

Early life and career
Chinnery was born in Richmond, London, and attended Gosforth Grammar School. He joined the BBC in 1941 aged 16. From 1943 to 1947 he was in the RAF. He returned to the BBC in 1947, becoming a producer in 1952.

BBC Radio 1 controller
He took over from Charles McLelland and was succeeded by Johnny Beerling. He relaxed the guidelines on banning records, allowing records to mention a commercial product, and ended the Sounds of the Seventies programme.

Chinnery admitted that while he was controller he confronted Jimmy Savile over allegations of inappropriate sexual activities, which Savile denied; Chinnery said "there was no reason to disbelieve" him. Chinnery took no further action, saying: "He was the sort of man that attracted rumours, after all, because he was single, he was always on the move, he was always going around the country."

Personal life
Chinnery married Doreen Clarke in 1953 in Marylebone.

External links
 Radio Rewind
 Interview recorded in 1983 (4 parts) for British Library's Oral History of Recorded Sound

References

1925 births
2015 deaths
People from Gosforth
BBC Radio 1 controllers
BBC radio producers
Jimmy Savile
People educated at Gosforth Academy
Place of death missing
20th-century British businesspeople